"The Best Day" is a song written by Dean Dillon and Carson Chamberlain, and performed by American country music singer George Strait.  It was released in January 2000 as the first single from his compilation album Latest Greatest Straitest Hits.  The song reached the top of the Billboard Hot Country Singles & Tracks chart.

Content
The song is about a father, who recalls his son describing the activities of his life. The first verse recalls a father-son campout, and the young man looks forward to a weekend of fishing, conversation, bonding, and other camping-related activities. The second verse shows a young man becoming a teenager, and getting a Chevrolet Corvette. The third and final verse is set on the son's wedding day. As they stand in a room of the church with our tuxes on, the son learned in childhood applied to his new marriage: "I'm the luckiest man alive, this is the best day of my life". The song is in the key of A major with a 4/4 time signature and a slow tempo of about 66 beats per minute. Its intro uses the pattern A-Aaug-D-E7, and the verses use a pattern of A-D-E-A.

Critical reception
Larry Flick, of Billboard magazine reviewed the song favorably, calling it a "well-written tale that listeners will find easily relatable, and the chorus makes this the ultimate feel-good tune to kick off the millennium." He goes on to say that Strait's "warm-throated delivery is all honest emotion."

Chart performance
The song entered the Hot Country Singles & Tracks chart at number 48 on the chart dated January 1, 2000, and spent 29 weeks on the chart. The song also climbed to number 1 after spending 17 weeks on the chart, where it held number 1 for three weeks on the chart dated April 22, 2000. In addition, this song became Strait's 36th Billboard Number One as a solo artist.

Peak positions

End of year charts

References

Songs about parenthood
2000 singles
2000 songs
George Strait songs
Songs written by Dean Dillon
Song recordings produced by Tony Brown (record producer)
Songs written by Carson Chamberlain
MCA Nashville Records singles